The praetexta or fabula praetexta was a genre of Latin tragedy introduced at Rome by Gnaeus Naevius in the third century BC. It dealt with historical Roman figures, in place of the conventional Greek myths. Subsequent writers of praetextae included Ennius, Pacuvius and Lucius Accius. The name refers to the toga praetexta, purple striped, that was the official dress of Roman magistrates and priests. It was mainly a Roman garment. The toga praetexta was also worn by Roman freeborn girls before they came of age. 

All Roman Republican tragedies are now lost. From the Imperial era only one play has survived, the Octavia.

See also
Fabula atellana
Fabula crepidata
Fabula palliata
Fabula saltata
Fabula togata
Theatre of ancient Rome

References

Sources
 Bernhard Zimmermann and Thomas Baier "Tragedy" in: Brill's New Pauly, Antiquity volumes edited by: Hubert Cancik and Helmuth Schneider. Consulted online on 21 July 2017

Tragedies (dramas)
Latin-language literature
Ancient Roman leisure
Ancient Roman theatre
History of theatre